Southbridge or South Bridge may refer to:

Locations
New Zealand
 Southbridge, New Zealand
 Southbridge Branch, New Zealand, a railway line
 Southbridge District High School
 Southbridge Primary School
United Kingdom
 South Bridge, Edinburgh
United States
 Southbridge, Massachusetts
 Southbridge Municipal Airport
 Southbridge, Virginia
 Southbridge Towers, Manhattan, New York
 John Harris Bridge, Harrisburg, Pennsylvania, known locally as "South Bridge"
 Gateway Bridge (Illinois–Iowa), Clinton, Iowa, also known as “South Bridge”

Other uses
 Southbridge (computing), a chip that implements the "slower" capabilities of the motherboard